Machaki Mal Singh is a small village located 7 km from Fardikot in the Indian state of Punjab. It is situated on the banks of the Rajasthan Feeder Canal. The village originated hundreds of years ago and is named after the first man who lived here, Mall Singh Sekhon. Sardar Mall singh Sekhon was a famous wrestler of that time,and owner of a big land. His seventh generation is lived in this village near Gurudwara khuhi sahib .It has associations with Sikh guru, Gobind Singh, and Baba Joginder Singh Ji. The village natives built the Gurudwara Kareer Sahib and every February they hold a celebration in memory of Joginder Singh Ji.

More 

Nearby villages are Dhiman Wali (1.3 km), Jalaleana (3.1 km), Phide Khurd (3.4 km), Dago Romana (3.9 km), Ratti Rori (3.9 km). Nearby towns are Faridkot (7.3 km), Kot Kapura (9.2 km).

Other villages in Post Office (151209,) are Machaki Mal Singh, Dhiman Wali, Wara Draka, Sandhwan,

calling code +91-1639

Banks near by Machaki Mal Singh 
1 . ORIENTAL BANK OF COMMERCE, SADIQ 
IFSC CODE : orbc0101344. 
MICR CODE : 151022104.

2 . PUNJAB NATIONAL BANK, KOTKAPURA MAIN 
IFSC CODE : punb0027300. 
MICR CODE : 151024802.

Notable residents 
(1) Sardar Sahib Sardar Kishan Singh Sekhon was tehsildar in state of punjab also served in Royal Faridkot state and landlord in village Machaki Mal Singh, Faridkot, Punjab India

(2) Sardar Biram Singh Sekhon was tehsildarin state of punjab and landlord in Village Machaki Mal Singh, Faridkot,Punjab India 

(3) Sardar Karanbir Inder Singh Sekhon retd DyDisst Attorney and running Law firms in Faridkot also a landlord in village Machaki Mal Singh, Faridkot, Punjab India
(4) Sardar Jai Singh Sekhon is Lamberdar of Machaki Mal Singh,Faridkot,Punjab India.

International Kabaddi player, Babbu Sekhon 
 Jagdeep Sekhon NRI 

Amandeep Sekhon S/O Sardar Karanbir Inder Singh Sekhon Winnipeg  Manitoba CANADA

References

Cities and towns in Faridkot district